Dylan Benoit is a Canadian-born chef who currently hosts the Food Network Canada/Cooking Channel television series Fire Masters.

Early life and education

Benoit was born in Scarborough, Ontario; but his family relocated to Midhurst before eventually settling in Barrie. After attending St. Joseph's High School, he attended George Brown College and graduated with a degree in culinary arts.

Personal life
Benoit worked under chef Mark McEwan at ONE restaurant prior to becoming a private chef. He currently hosts the Food Network Canada/Cooking Channel television series Fire Masters. Since 2010, Benoit has resided in the Cayman Islands.

References

External links
 

1980s births
Date of birth missing (living people)
Canadian television chefs
Living people
People from Scarborough, Toronto
Canadian male chefs
Chefs from Toronto